The 1951 Columbia Lions football team was an American football team that represented Columbia University as an independent during the 1951 college football season.

In their 22nd season under head coach Lou Little, the Lions compiled a 5–3 record, and outscored their opponents 149 to 103. Howard Hansen was the team captain.

Only eight games were played, rather than the usual nine, because two Columbia players were stricken with polio late in the preseason, prompting the team to pull out of its planned season opener at Princeton. When testing showed that no other team members were affected, the Lions went ahead with the remaining eight games of their schedule.

Columbia played its home games at Baker Field in Upper Manhattan, in New York City.

Schedule

References

Columbia
Columbia Lions football seasons
Columbia Lions football